József Téger (date of birth unknown, died 1917) was a Hungarian wrestler. He competed in the men's Greco-Roman lightweight at the 1908 Summer Olympics.

He died in World War I as a prisoner-of-war in Russia.

References

External links
 

Year of birth missing
1917 deaths
Hungarian male sport wrestlers
Olympic wrestlers of Hungary
Wrestlers at the 1908 Summer Olympics
Place of birth missing